Gabriele "Gabi" Kühn ( Lohs, born 11 March 1957) is a German rower who competed for East Germany in the 1976 Summer Olympics and in the 1980 Summer Olympics.

She was born in Dresden. In 1976, she was a crew member of the East German boat, which won the gold medal in the coxed four event. Four years later, she won her second gold medal with the East German boat in the eight competition.

She married after the 1977 rowing season. She is the stepmother of the American coxswain Peter Cipollone.

References

External links 
 

1957 births
Living people
East German female rowers
Olympic rowers of East Germany
Rowers at the 1976 Summer Olympics
Rowers at the 1980 Summer Olympics
Olympic gold medalists for East Germany
Rowers from Dresden
Olympic medalists in rowing
World Rowing Championships medalists for East Germany
Medalists at the 1980 Summer Olympics
Medalists at the 1976 Summer Olympics